Thomas Whitfield may refer to:
 Thomas Whitfield (singer) (1954–1992),  American gospel singer and songwriter
 Thomas Whitfield (entrepreneur) (born 1981), British entrepreneur
 Thomas Whitfield Davidson (1876–1974), United States federal judge